Daniel Halpin (born 1985), also known as Tox, is a British graffiti writer. He has found fame for adding his tag, always simply the word Tox followed by a number indicating the year, in a very large number of locations across the London Underground network and walls around London and Glasgow.

He was convicted of criminal damage in June 2011 and imprisoned after a history of ignoring ASBOs. Prosecutor Hugo Lodge told the court: "He is no Banksy. He doesn't have the artistic skills, so he has to get his tag up as much as possible." After his trial Ben Eine, another graffiti artist, criticised his work, saying: "His statement is Tox, Tox, Tox, Tox, over and over again." he said that the tags are "incredibly basic" and lacking "skill, flair or unique style". A sentence of 27 months was later passed, the judge commenting "There is nothing artistic about what you do".

Halpin was selling canvases bearing his tag for £75 each in 2009.

References

External links
Index of Banksy works including Tox mural

English graffiti artists
Living people
Artists from London
Pseudonymous artists
1985 births